Daouda is a given name. Notable people with the name include:

Surname
Abdou Daouda, member of the National Assembly of Niger and government Minister
Kamilou Daouda (born 1987), Nigerien footballer
Kassaly Daouda (born 1983), Nigerien footballer
Mariko Daouda (born 1981), Ivorian footballer

Given name
Daouda Compaoré (born 1973), Burkinabé football player
David Daouda Coulibaly (born 1978), Malian football player
Daouda Diakité (born 1983), Burkinabé football goalkeeper
Daouda Diémé (born 1989), Senegalese footballer
Daouda Jabi (born 1981), Guinean footballer
Daouda Kanté (born 1978), Malian football (soccer) defender
Daouda Karaboué (born 1975), French handball player, Olympic gold medallist
Daouda Marté, Nigerien politician
Daouda Sow (boxer) (born 1983), amateur boxer from France
Daouda Sow (politician) (1933–2009), Senegalese politician and legislator
Daouda Malam Wanké (1946–2004), military and political leader in Niger

See also
Dauda (disambiguation)
Douaouda